The Lawrance J-1 was an engine developed by Charles Lanier Lawrance and used in American aircraft in the early 1920s. It was a nine-cylinder, air-cooled radial design.

Development

During World War I the Lawrance Aero Engine Company of New York City produced the crude opposed twins that powered the Penguin trainers, and the Lawrance L-1 60 hp Y-type radial.

After the end of World War I, the Lawrance engineers worked with both the Army and the Navy in developing their L-1 onto a nine-cylinder radial engine, which became the 200 hp Model J-1. It was the best American air-cooled engine at the time and passed its 50-hour test in 1922.

The U.S. Navy badly needed light, reliable engines for its carrierborne aircraft. As a means of pressuring Wright and other companies into developing radial engines, it gave a contract to Lawrance for 200 of the J-1 radial and ceased buying the liquid-cooled Wright-Hispano engines. At the urging of the Army and Navy the Wright Aeronautical Corporation bought the Lawrance Company, and subsequent engines were known as Wright radials. The Wright Whirlwind had essentially the same lower end (crankcase, cam, and crankshaft) as the J-1.

Applications
 Dayton-Wright XPS-1
 Naval Aircraft Factory N2N
 Naval Aircraft Factory TS-1
 Huff-Daland TA-2 trainer prototype - one example only re-engined
 Huff-Daland TA-5 trainer prototype
 Huff-Daland TA-6 trainer prototype
 Huff-Daland HN-2 naval trainer

Engines on display
The New England Air Museum in Windsor Locks, Connecticut, has a Lawrance J-1 on display.

Specifications (J-1)

See also
 ABC Dragonfly, contemporary production British air-cooled nine-cylinder aviation radial, unsuccessful in service.

References

External links

 Wright J-5 "Whirlwind" (PDF), by Kimble D. McCutcheon, from the Aircraft Engine Historical Society (AEHS).
 Part 2 of "Air-Cooled Aircraft Engine Cylinders", by George Genevro, also from AEHS.
  A detailed contemporary discussion of the Lawrance engine from Flight magazine.
 

1920s aircraft piston engines
Aircraft air-cooled radial piston engines
J-1